Sviatoslav Shevchuk (born 5 May 1970 in Stryi, Ukrainian SSR) has been the Major Archbishop of the Ukrainian Greek Catholic Church (UGCC) since 25 March 2011, serving as the Eastern Catholic church's leader.

Priesthood
Shevchuk was ordained as a priest on 26 June 1994. He is an alumnus of the Pontifical University of St. Thomas Aquinas Angelicum where he earned a Doctorate in theology in 1999. After completing his theological training Shevchuk served as rector of the seminary of Lviv.

From 2002 to 2005 he worked as head of the secretariat of Major Archbishop and Cardinal Lubomyr Husar.

Episcopacy
Shevchuk was appointed auxiliary bishop of the Eparchy of Santa María del Patrocinio en Buenos Aires on 14 January 2009 and consecrated by Archbishop Ihor Vozniak on 7 April 2009. On 10 April 2010, he was appointed Apostolic Administrator of the same diocese upon the retirement of Bishop Miguel Mykycej.

Major archepiscopacy
On 23 March 2011, Shevchuk was elected Major Archbishop of the Ukrainian Greek Catholic Church to replace Lubomyr Husar, who had retired for health reasons. Pope Benedict XVI confirmed his selection on 25 March 2011.

Enthronement
Shevchuk was enthroned as Major Archbishop on 27 March 2011 in the UGCC's new mother church, the Cathedral of the Resurrection of Christ in Kyiv, which was still under construction at the time. He was the first primate to be enthroned in Kyiv in 400 years.

Representatives of all three main branches of Ukrainian Eastern Orthodoxy were present for his enthronement, including Metropolitan Mefodiy (UOAC), Metropolitan Volodymyr (UOC-MP), and Bishop  (UOC-KP).

Visits
On 31 May 2012, Sviatoslav held his first pastoral visit to Canada. He visited Edmonton after being met by Eparch David Motiuk and other clergy upon his arrival in Calgary. He attended events at St. Josaphat Cathedral and St. George Parish. On 2 June, the head of the UGCC celebrated the 100th anniversary of the establishment of the Parish of the Assumption of the Holy Mother of God in Calgary. He again returned to Canada later in 2012, and on Sunday, 9 September, after the participants took an oath the previous day, Shevchuk celebrated the Divine Liturgy to open a worldwide Ukrainian Catholic Synod of Bishops at Saints Volodymyr and Olha Cathedral in Winnipeg, Manitoba, Canada.

In May 2014, he again visited Canada to mark the arrival of the Sheptytsky Institute within the University of St. Michael's College at the University of Toronto.

Shevchuk visited England in 2017, celebrating the Divine Liturgy at Westminster Cathedral on 28 October.

2022 Russian invasion
In early February 2022, the Shevchuk said during a conference with Aid to the Church in Need that growing tension was not so much about Ukraine, as the result of a conflict "between Russia and the Western world, particularly the US" and that "The Ukrainian crisis is not just a problem for Ukrainians." Identifying a growing "true idolatry of violence", Shevchuck urged peaceful dialogue over military action.

During the February 2022 Russian invasion of Ukraine, Shevchuk spoke in opposition to the invasion and warned that the fighting could result in Ukraine devolving into "a death camp." Pope Francis promised Shevchuk "I will do everything I can" and praised the decision to open the basement of Resurrection Cathedral in Kyiv as a bomb shelter. Shevchuk appealed to the Russians to not target churches following intelligence reports suggesting that a military strike was planned against the Saint Sophia Cathedral in Kyiv.

In March, Shevchuk spoke to the World Council of Churches and thanked them for submitting a letter to the Patriarch of the Russian Orthodox Church. Shevchuk asserted that "war is always a failure for humanity. War is always a moment of shame, a moment in which man’s dignity is humiliated. When we strive for peace, everything is possible. When war breaks out, we can lose everything", adding "In Ukraine, today, we are seeing great contempt for human dignity. With war, man loses his humanity, especially he who starts war, he who starts war diminishes himself in his humanity. He who kills his neighbour, before all else, destroys the humanity within himself, destroys his own dignity".

Views

On the patriarchal title

On 29 March 2011, Shevchuk said "I'm departing with my bishops and all of the metropolitans of our church to Rome, because it's our duty to make a courtesy visit to the Holy Father (i.e., the Pope)," he said at a press conference in Kyiv. The UGCC leader said that the UGCC Synod of Bishops had prepared a number of proposals for the Pope. "We're really going to tell of how our church is developing and that each developing church [becomes] a patriarchate, because a patriarchate is a period in the completion of the development of a church," he said.

Cardinal Slipyj in the 1960s already petitioned for the patriarchal title. Instead, Pope Paul VI responded by creating the station of "major archbishop", which grants nearly all the powers and capacities of a patriarch at the head of a self-governing church in full communion with Rome, just without the title itself. On 12 June 2012 Shevchuk was appointed a member of the Pontifical Council for Promoting Christian Unity.

On his own election
In April 2011, Shevchuk said while visiting Rome to meet Pope Benedict XVI, that he believes he was elected "despite my age". Ukrainian bishops from around the world, who met in a synod in late March to elect a new Major Archbishop for their church, were looking for a leader who could "unite the church in Ukraine and outside Ukraine", who could "promote the unity of Christians in Ukraine and establish some sort of dialogue with the new Ukrainian government. ...The No. 1 priority for each head of a church is evangelization, preaching the Gospel of Jesus Christ in today's world. ...Of course, our church is growing, is developing its structures, ... but we are conscious that the decision about the patriarchate belongs to the Holy Father and we would never press him. We respect his freedom." Shevchuk said his age is not really so shocking when one considers that the average age of his priests is about 35. "In our tradition, we do have a married clergy, but a married clergy is not the main reason we have so many young priests", he added.

On 22 June 2011 Shevchuk was appointed a member of the Congregation for the Oriental Churches to a five-year term.

On meeting with the Russian Orthodox Patriarch
When asked in April 2011 whether he would wish to meet the Russian Orthodox Patriarch Kirill, Shevchuk said that "I would like very much to visit him and hold a personal meeting with him. I am convinced that in peacefully and openly communicating with each other, we can relieve any tension ... I think that today, we should heal the wounds rather than irritate and deepen them. One can heal the wounds of our memory only with mutual forgiveness. Therefore, as for any of our brethren or neighbors who wounded us or were wounded by us, the best way to communicate is to be open in a brotherly dialogue, be open to the purification of our memory, to ask for forgiveness and to forgive."

External links

Official profile of Sviatoslav Shevchuk at VK

Footnotes

References

1970 births
Living people
Metropolitans of Kyiv-Galicia
Ukrainian Eastern Catholics
People from Stryi
Pontifical University of Saint Thomas Aquinas alumni
Eastern Catholic bishops in Ukraine